Claustrophobia (retitled Serial Slayer for home video release) is a 2003 horror thriller written and directed by Mark Tapio Kines. The film stars Melanie Lynskey, Sheeri Rappaport, Mary Lynn Rajskub, Will Collyer, and Judith O'Dea.

Plot
In a quiet neighborhood outside of Oakland, California, the residents are being held hostage with terror when a serial killer armed with a crossbow begins to stalk and kill the residents from their rooftops.

Casting

Claustrophobia has only three main speaking roles. Kines first invited Melanie Lynskey to take part in the film, as the two had worked together previously on his debut feature Foreign Correspondents. The search then began for the two remaining leads, with Kines receiving over 1,000 headshots during the auditioning process. Sheeri Rappaport and Mary Lynn Rajskub were cast soon thereafter.

After a brief rehearsal period, Melanie Lynskey, Sheeri Rappaport and Mary Lynn Rajskub were set to star in the film. Kines was also able to cast Judith O'Dea, star of the classic 1960s horror film Night of the Living Dead, in a small role.

Filming
Principal photography began on June 3, 2002, and wrapped on June 13. Most of the film was shot in a single house with only a few exterior scenes. The film was shot entirely in daylight, something Kines felt added a surreal and nightmarish quality to the story.

Post-production
Kines drafted his friend Christopher Farrell to score the film. Farrell had previously scored Kines' first film, Foreign Correspondents. The titles for the film were done by William Lebeda, whose credits include The Village and Drag Me to Hell. The film was fully completed on May 31, 2003 – 364 days after the first day of production.

Reception
Dread Centreal said of the film, "What it is is a complete and utter waste of time, money (both yours if you rent it and whatever small amount the filmmakers spent on making it), and crossbow bolts, which I’m sure could’ve been put to better use hunting innocent woodland creatures or something."

References

External links
.

Claustrophobia official site at Cassava Films

2003 films
2003 horror films
American slasher films
2000s English-language films
2000s American films